Jackpot is a 2019 Indian Tamil-language fantasy comedy film written and directed by Kalyaan. The film stars Jyothika and Revathi, in lead roles, while Samuthirakani, Mansoor Ali Khan, Yogi Babu and Anandaraj playing supporting roles. Revathi plays the character of Masha for the third time after  Arangetra Velai and Gulaebaghavali.  The film is produced by actor Suriya under his production banner 2D Entertainment. The music for the film is scored by Vishal Chandrasekhar. The principal photography of the film commenced on 12 February 2019. The film was released on 2 August 2019. The film received mixed to positive reviews from critics.The film was a box office hit.

Plot 
The film opens in 1918 and follows a milkman who accidentally stumbles upon an inexhaustible vessel (Akshaya Patra) while digging for a well. He fills it with cows milk, however, when he continues digging the well, he is surprised that the vessel produced a lot of milk from a small amount. He uses the vessel to change his fortune and become rich, but not for long as it eventually gets stolen by two people. Many years later, the vessel is found by an old lady who sells idlis by a riverbank and she uses it to feed more people. She passes on the secret about the vessel and its power to Akshaya (Jyothika) and Masha (Revathi), who says she had buried the vessel due to fear that someone might steal it from her. She says that she has buried it in Maanasthan's (Anandaraj)) rice mill near a bull shed. Akshaya and Maasha get the help of Mottai (Rajendran) and Rahul Vijay (Yogi Babu). How they get their hands on the vessel while dealing with Maanasthan and Bhai (Mansoor Ali Khan) forms the crux of the story.

Cast 

 Jyothika as Akshaya 
 Revathi as Mashavaani "Maasha"
 Yogi Babu as Rahul Vijay
 Anandaraj as Maanasthan and Inspector Maanasthi
 Rajendran as Motta
 Mansoor Ali Khan as Bhai
 Sachu as Manimegalai
 Manobala as Rice Mill Rayyappan
 Mime Gopi as Rahul's father
 Devadarshini as Rahul's mother
 Jagan as Rahul's friend
 Imman Annachi as Police Constable
 Anthony Daasan as Pannaiyar
 Suzane George as Jail Warden
 Subhashini Kannan as Mrs. Maanasthan
 Tiger Garden Thangadurai as Maanasthan's assistant 
 Vinu Krithik as Real Rahul
 Redin Kingsley as Tumbler, Maanasthan's assistant 
 Veerasamar as a worker at Maanasthan's house
Ashwin Raja as Maanasthan's assistant 
Mahanadhi Shankar as Jail Warden
 Sembaruthi Sanjay as Egg Seller 
 Supergood Subramani as Restaurant owner
 Mippu as a member of Bhai's gang
 Samuthirakani as Film Director (Special Appearance)

Soundtrack 

The soundtrack of the film was composed by Vishal Chandrasekhar on lyrics of Vivek, Arunraja Kamaraj, Lady Kash and Ku. Karthik.

Reception 
According to Behindwoods,it stated that "Jyothika and Revathy charmingly playing to the gallery and Anandraj's comedies make Jackpot a one time watch" giving it a 2.2/5. While The Times of India giving three stars out of five, gave a positive review "Though the story has nothing new to offer except the plot surrounding the vessel, the film manages to entertain, thanks to some of the comic scenes which are devoid of double-entendre. The background score, however, reminds us of music from a few other movies. The two songs do not add much value to the story but look vibrant on the screen. An unapologetically made fun film, this may appeal to those who love watching movies in this genre." Baradwaj Rangan of Film Companion South wrote "...the writing is all over the place and the director seems to have other concerns. He wants to project his heroine as a “mass” star. She gets to do slo-mo walks. She gets to beat up many men. She gets to mouth lines delivered on screen by other “mass” heroes. All this simply kills the mood".

Notes

References

External links
 

2019 films
2010s Tamil-language films
2019 action comedy films
Indian action comedy films
2010s heist films
Indian heist films
Films scored by Vishal Chandrasekhar